Télesphore-Damien Bouchard (December 20, 1881 – November 13, 1962) was a politician in Quebec, Canada.

Born in Saint-Hyacinthe, Quebec, he was the mayor of the municipality from 1917 to 1930 and from 1932 to 1944 and president of the Federation of Canadian Municipalities in 1918. He also founded the Union des municipalités de la province du Québec (Federation of municipalities in the province of Quebec) in 1919. He served as Liberal leader of the Opposition in the Legislative Assembly of Quebec from 1936 to 1939, after Liberal leader Adélard Godbout lost the 1936 election and also narrowly lost his own seat. Bouchard served as opposition leader while Godbout remained leader of the Liberal Party.

After the Liberals returned to power in the 1939 election, he served in Godbout's cabinet. Resigned in 1944 when he was appointed to the Senate, where he remained until his death. Overall, he was the MLA for the district of Saint-Hyacinthe from 1912 to 1919 and from 1923 to 1944.

A leading campaigner for public ownership of electric utilities, he became first president of Hydro-Québec in April 1944. Two months later he was fired by Premier Godbout, after Bouchard made a series of anticlerical statements.

Biography

 GUTTMAN, Frank Myron, The Devil from Saint-Hyacinthe: Senator Télesphore-Damien Bouchard, A Tragic Hero, iUniverse Books, New York, 2007, 405 p.

See also
Politics of Quebec
Quebec general elections
List of Quebec leaders of the Opposition
Timeline of Quebec history

References

External links
 

1881 births
1962 deaths
Canadian senators from Quebec
Liberal Party of Canada senators
Mayors of places in Quebec
Quebec Liberal Party MNAs
Presidents of the National Assembly of Quebec
Hydro-Québec
Vice Presidents of the National Assembly of Quebec